EQL may refer to:

 Air São Tomé and Príncipe, a defunct airline
 Earthquake light, a reportedly luminous aerial phenomenon
 Energy Queensland Limited, owner of Ergon Energy, Australia
 Ecosystem Qualified Lead

See also

 European Quality of Life Survey (EQLS); See European Foundation for the Improvement of Living and Working Conditions
 
 EQ1 (disambiguation)
 Equal (disambiguation)